Synaphea rangiferops is a shrub endemic to Western Australia.

It is found in the Wheatbelt region of Western Australia between Moora and York where it grows in sandy-loamy soils often with gravel.

References

Eudicots of Western Australia
rangiferops
Endemic flora of Western Australia
Plants described in 1995